"Shama Lama Ding Dong" is a song written by  and performed by fictional band Otis Day and the Knights in the 1978 film National Lampoon's Animal House. Although Otis Day was portrayed by DeWayne Jessie in the film, the lead vocals were actually performed by Lloyd G. Williams, with backing vocals provided by Melvin Britt and Sidney Juston.

A version of the song, by beach music group Band of Oz, won People's Choice Song of the Year at the 1995 Carolina Beach Music Awards. It was also covered by John Mellencamp as the B-side of his 1987 single "Cherry Bomb."

The song was included on two albums by the University of California Men's Octet. It has also been performed and recorded by the Dartmouth Aires at Dartmouth College, the school on which Animal House was modeled.

See also
"Rama Lama Ding Dong", a 1957 song by The Edsels
"Shamma Lamma Ding Dong", a track on the 2004 jazz album Enter the Mowo! by Mocean Worker

References

Songs written for films
1978 songs
Rhythm and blues songs
John Mellencamp songs
Onomatopoeia